Events from the year 1567 in France.

Incumbents 
Monarch – Charles IX of France

Events
January 20 – Battle of Rio de Janeiro: Portuguese forces under the command of Estácio de Sá definitively drive the French out of Rio de Janeiro, ending the occupation of France Antarctique.
 September 28 – Surprise of Meaux: Louis, Prince of Condé, and Gaspard de Coligny fail in an attempt to capture Charles IX and his mother at Meaux.
 September 29 (Michaelmas)
 The Second War of Religion is triggered by the events of yesterday. Huguenots go on to capture several cities (including Orléans) and march on Paris.
 Michelade: Protestant massacre of Catholics, including 24 priests and monks, in Nîmes.
 November 10 – Battle of Saint-Denis: Anne de Montmorency, with 16,000 Royalists, falls on Condé's 3,500 Huguenots. The Huguenots surprisingly hold on for some hours before being driven off. Montmorency is mortally wounded.
 The Ancient Diocese of Boulogne is created.

Births
 April 26 – Nicolas Formé, composer (d. 1638)
 August 21 – Francis de Sales, Catholic Bishop of Geneva, born in the Duchy of Savoy (d. 1622)
 September 24 – Martin Fréminet, painter and engraver (d. 1619)
 November 21 – Anne de Xainctonge, religious (d. 1621)
 Pierre Biard, settler and Jesuit missionary (d. 1622)
 Jacques Clément, assassin of Henry III (k. 1589)
 Nicolas Cordier, sculptor, painter and printmaker (d. 1612 in Rome)

Deaths
 January 17 – Sampiero Corso, Corsican mercenary leader and governor of Aix-en-Provence, killed (b. 1498 in the Republic of Genoa)
 November 12 – Anne de Montmorency, Constable of France (b. 1493)
 Ligier Richier, sculptor (b. c.1500)

See also

References

1560s in France